Jack Warner (1870 – 12 January 1938) was a British sports shooter. He competed in the stationary target small-bore rifle event at the 1908 Summer Olympics.

References

British male sport shooters
Olympic shooters of Great Britain
Shooters at the 1908 Summer Olympics
Place of birth missing
1870 births
1938 deaths